Victor Edmund Bourdillon (18 June 1897 – 16 September 1985) was a South African born Rhodesian cricketer.  Bourdillon was a right-handed batsman.  He was born at Bloemfontein, Orange Free State, and was educated at Brighton College in England.

Bourdillon played three first-class matches for Sussex in the 1919 County Championship against Gloucestershire, Nottinghamshire and Essex.  He struggled in his three first-class matches, scoring just 15 runs at an average of 2.50, with a high score of 7.

He died at Harare, Zimbabwe on 16 September 1985.  His brother, Thomas, played first-class cricket, as did his great-nephew Paul Bourdillon.

References

External links
Victor Bourdillon at ESPNcricinfo
Victor Bourdillon at CricketArchive

1897 births
1985 deaths
People from Bloemfontein
People educated at Brighton College
Zimbabwean cricketers
Sussex cricketers